1953 Pequeña Copa del Mundo de Clubes may refer to:

 1953 Pequeña Copa del Mundo de Clubes (1st tournament)
 1953 Pequeña Copa del Mundo de Clubes (2nd tournament)